Wiëlle Douma (born 13 January 2000) is a Dutch footballer who plays as defender for ADO Den Haag in the Eredivisie.

Club career

International career

Personal life
Douma was born in.

Honours

Club

International

References

Living people
Dutch women's footballers
Eredivisie (women) players
2000 births
Women's association football defenders
ADO Den Haag (women) players